Thomas Thornton (c.1541–1629) was an English Church of England clergyman and academic administrator.

Thornton received a Bachelor of Divinity degree followed by a Doctor of Divinity degree at Oxford University. He was based at Christ Church, Oxford and was a Canon of Christ Church Cathedral, Oxford. He was twice Vice-Chancellor at the University of Oxford during 1583–4 and 1599–1600.
He was also Precentor of Hereford Cathedral from 1573, and Master of the Library there from 1595; he re-organized the library and had new bookcases installed on the model of those in the Bodleian Library

References

1541 births
Year of birth uncertain
1629 deaths
Fellows of Christ Church, Oxford
16th-century English Anglican priests
17th-century English Anglican priests
Vice-Chancellors of the University of Oxford